Kevin McCarthy (February 15, 1914 – September 11, 2010) was an American stage, film and television actor remembered as the male lead in the horror science fiction film Invasion of the Body Snatchers (1956).

Following several television guest roles, McCarthy gave his first credited film performance in Death of a Salesman (1951), portraying Biff Loman to Fredric March's Willy Loman. The role earned him a Golden Globe Award and a nomination for the Academy Award for Best Supporting Actor.

Early life
McCarthy was born in Seattle, Washington, the son of Roy Winfield McCarthy and Martha Therese (née Preston). His father was descended from a wealthy Irish American family based in Minnesota. His mother was born in Washington State to a Protestant father and a non-observant Jewish mother; McCarthy's mother converted to Roman Catholicism before her marriage. He was the brother of author Mary McCarthy, and a distant cousin of U.S. Senator and presidential candidate Eugene McCarthy of Minnesota. His parents both died in the 1918 flu pandemic, and the four children went to live with relatives in Minneapolis. After five years of near-Dickensian mistreatment, described in Mary McCarthy's memoirs, the children were separated: Mary lived with their maternal grandparents, and Kevin and his younger brothers were raised by relatives in Minneapolis. McCarthy graduated in 1932 from Campion High School in Prairie du Chien, Wisconsin, then attended the University of Minnesota, where he appeared in his first play, Shakespeare's Henry IV, Part 1, and discovered a love of acting.

Career

Early career and military service
During his service in World War II in the United States Army Air Forces, in addition to his acting career, McCarthy appeared in a number of training films. At least one of these films (covering the Boeing B-17), has been distributed on DVD. McCarthy was a founding member of The Actors Studio.

Breakthrough in film
McCarthy's breakthrough role was in Death of a Salesman (1951) portraying Biff Loman to Fredric March's Willy Loman. He had first performed the role in the London theatrical debut and was the only member of that ensemble to be cast in László Benedek's film adaptation. He received good notices for his onscreen work, receiving the Golden Globe Award for New Star of the Year – Actor and a nomination for the Academy Award for Best Supporting Actor.

1956–1975

His starring roles include the lead in the science fiction film classic Invasion of the Body Snatchers (1956), which remains the film for which he is most widely known. On television, he starred the short-lived series The Survivors (1969) with Lana Turner. He also appeared as a guest star in many television programs, playing a wide variety of character roles.

McCarthy appeared with Alexis Smith in the NBC anthology series The Joseph Cotten Show in the episode "We Who Love Her" (1956). He was cast in an episode of the religion anthology series Crossroads. McCarthy appeared in the 1959 episode "The Wall Between" of CBS's The DuPont Show with June Allyson. He guest-starred in a classic episode of CBS's The Twilight Zone entitled "Long Live Walter Jameson" (1960) as the title character.

McCarthy made two appearances on The Rifleman, starring Chuck Connors and Johnny Crawford. He portrayed the historical Mark Twain in "The Shattered Idol" (episode 120; original air date: December 4, 1961) and Winslow Quince in "Suspicion" (episode 157; original air date: January 14, 1963).
The Rifleman – Season 4 Episodes
The Rifleman – Suspicion, Episode 157, Season 5

In 1963, McCarthy appeared in the ABC medical drama Breaking Point in the episode titled "Fire and Ice". He guest starred in the ABC drama Going My Way, about the Roman Catholic priesthood in New York City. He was cast as well in a 1964 episode of James Franciscus's NBC education drama Mr. Novak. In 1966, he appeared in the episode "Wife Killer" of the ABC adventure series The Fugitive. In 1967, he guest starred in the episode "Never Chase a Rainbow" of NBC's western series The Road West, starring Barry Sullivan. Also that year, he guest-starred in the episode "The Watchers" on the television series The Invaders.

In 1968, McCarthy guest starred on Hawaii Five-O in the episode "Full Fathom Five" as the chief antagonist, Victor Reese.  He appeared as Maj. Gen Kroll in "The Night of the Doomsday Formula" in season 4 of The Wild Wild West. In 1971, he guest-starred in the "Conqueror's Gold" episode of Bearcats!, which starred Rod Taylor, with whom McCarthy had appeared in the films A Gathering of Eagles, Hotel, and The Hell With Heroes.

1975–1996
In 1976, McCarthy starred in the Broadway play Poor Murderer. In 1977, he and Clu Gulager, previously cast with Barry Sullivan on NBC's The Tall Man, appeared in the episode "The Army Deserter" of the NBC western series The Oregon Trail with Rod Taylor. In 1978, McCarthy played a cameo role in a remake of Invasion of the Body Snatchers as a man running through the streets shouting a warning in the same manner as his character did in the original 1956 film. He appeared in NBC's Flamingo Road (1980–1982) as Claude Weldon, father of Morgan Fairchild's character. McCarthy appeared as Judge Crandall in The Midnight Hour, a 1985 comedy/horror television movie. Also that year, he guest-starred in a fourth-season episode of The A-Team called "Members Only".

McCarthy was one of four actors (with Dick Miller, Belinda Balaski and Robert Picardo) often cast by director Joe Dante. McCarthy's most notable role in Dante's films was in 1987 as the prime antagonist, Victor Scrimshaw, in Innerspace. They also were in Dante's Matinee.

In 1996, he played Gordon Fitzpatrick in The Pandora Directive, a full-motion video (FMV) adventure game starring Tex Murphy.

21st century
In 2007, McCarthy appeared as himself in the Anthony Hopkins film Slipstream, which made references to McCarthy's film Invasion of the Body Snatchers.

On October 24, 2009, McCarthy was honored at the Fort Lauderdale International Film Festival.

His last role in a feature-length movie was as The Grand Inquisitor in the sci-fi musical comedy The Ghastly Love of Johnny X (2012).

Personal life 
McCarthy was married to Augusta Dabney, with whom he had three children, from 1941 until their divorce in 1961. In 1979, he married Kate Crane, who survived him. The couple had two children.

From 1942, McCarthy and his wife Augusta Dabney had a close friendship with actor Montgomery Clift. McCarthy and Clift were cast in a play together, Ramon Naya's Mexican Mural. They became best friends, acted together in several more projects, and were believed by some prominent individuals, including Tennessee Williams, Truman Capote and George Whitmore, to have been lovers. They also collaborated on a screenplay for a film adaptation of the Tennessee Williams/Donald Windham play You Touched Me!, but it never came to fruition.

McCarthy died of pneumonia on September 11, 2010, at Cape Cod Hospital in Massachusetts at the age of 96.

Selected filmography 
 1944 Winged Victory as Ronnie Meade (uncredited)
 1951 Death of a Salesman as Biff Loman
 1954 Drive a Crooked Road as Steve Norris, Bank Robber
 1954 The Gambler from Natchez as André Rivage
 1955 Stranger on Horseback as Tom Bannerman
 1955 An Annapolis Story as Jim R. Scott
 1956 Invasion of the Body Snatchers as Dr. Miles Bennell
 1956 Nightmare as Stan Grayson
 1958 Diamond Safari as Harry Jordan
 1960 The Twilight Zone (TV Series) as Professor Walter Jameson / Tom Bowen / Major Hugh Skelton
 1961 The Misfits as Raymond Tabor
 1961 Way Out (TV Series) as Dr. Paul Sandham
 1962 40 Pounds of Trouble as Louie Blanchard
 1963 A Gathering of Eagles as General Jack 'Happy Jack' Kirby
 1963 An Affair of the Skin as Allen McCleod
 1963 The Prize as Dr. John Garrett
 1964 The Best Man as Dick Jensen
 1965 Mirage as Sylvester Josephson
 1966 A Big Hand for the Little Lady as Otto Habershaw
 1966 The Three Sisters as Vershinin
 1967 Hotel as Curtis O'Keefe
 1968 The Hell with Heroes as Colonel Wilson
 1968 If He Hollers, Let Him Go! as Leslie Whitlock
 1968 Ace High as Drake
 1968 The High Chaparral (TV Series) as Jim Forrest (North to Tucson)
 1968-1976 Hawaii Five-O (TV Series) as Hunter R. Hickey / Victor Reese
 1969-1970 Harold Robbins' The Survivors (TV Series) as Philip Hastings
 1971 Mission: Impossible (TV Series) as Whitmore Channing
 1972 Between Time and Timbuktu (TV Movie) as Bokonon
 1972 Richard as Washington Doctor
 1972 Kansas City Bomber as Burt Henry
 1973 Columbo (TV Series) as Dr. Frank Simmons
 1974 June Moon (TV Series) as Hart
 1974 Alien Thunder as Sergeant Malcolm Grant
 1975 Order to Assassinate as Ed McLean
 1976 Buffalo Bill and the Indians, or Sitting Bull's History Lesson as Major Burke
 1977 Mary Jane Harper Cried Last Night (TV Movie) as Tom Atherton
 1978 Piranha as Dr. Robert Hoak
 1978 Invasion of the Body Snatchers as Running Man (cameo appearance)
 1980 Hero at Large as Calvin Donnelly
 1980 Those Lips, Those Eyes as Mickey Bellinger
 1981 The Howling as Fred Francis
 1983 My Tutor as Mr. Chrystal
 1983 Twilight Zone: The Movie as Uncle Walt (segment "It's a Good Life")
 1983 Making of a Male Model as Ward Hawley
 1984 Invitation to Hell (TV Movie) as Mr. Thompson
 1985 The Midnight Hour (TV Movie) as Judge Crandall
 1986 A Masterpiece of Murder (TV Movie) as Jonathan Hire
 1986 The Golden Girls as Richard (Second Motherhood)
 1987 Innerspace as Victor Eugene Scrimshaw
 1987 Hostage as Colonel Tim Shaw
 1987 Poor Little Rich Girl: The Barbara Hutton Story (TV Movie) as Franklyn Hutton
 1988 Once Upon a Texas Train (TV Movie) as The Governor
 1987 Dark Tower as Sergie
 1989 Fast Food as Judge Reinholte
 1989 UHF as R.J. Fletcher
 1990 The Sleeping Car as Vincent Tuttle
 1990 Ghoulies III: Ghoulies Go to College (Video) as Professor Ragnar
 1991 Eve of Destruction as William Simmons (uncredited)
 1991 Final Approach as General Geller
 1992 The Distinguished Gentleman as Terry Corrigan
 1993 Matinee as General Ankrum (uncredited)
 1994 Greedy as Bartlett
 1994 Judicial Consent as Judge Pollan
 1995 Just Cause as Phil Prentiss
 1995 Steal Big Steal Little as Reed Tyler
 1995 Mommy as Fire Department Rescuer
 1996 The Pandora Directive (Video Game) as Gordon Fitzpatrick
 1998 Addams Family Reunion (TV Movie) as Grandpa Addams
 2002 The Legend of Razorback as Zondervan
 2003 Looney Tunes: Back in Action as Dr. Miles Bennell (cameo)
 2006 Loving Annabelle as Father Harris
 2006 Fallen Angels as Pastor Waltz
 2007 Slipstream as Himself
 2007 Trail of the Screaming Forehead as Latecomer
 2008 The Boneyard Collection
 2008 Her Morbid Desires (Video) as The Monk
 2009 Wesley as Bishop Ryder
 2012 The Ghastly Love of Johnny X as The Grand Inquisitor (final film role, posthumous release)

Radio appearances

References

External links 

Official site (last updated in 2007)

20th-century American male actors
American male film actors
American male stage actors
American male television actors
Male actors from Minneapolis
New Star of the Year (Actor) Golden Globe winners
University of Minnesota alumni
United States Army personnel of World War II
United States Army soldiers
Military personnel from Minnesota
American people of Irish descent
American people of Jewish descent
Deaths from pneumonia in Massachusetts
1914 births
2010 deaths